Wilhelm Friedrich Riem (17 December 1779 – 20 April 1857) was a German composer and conductor.

Life 
Born in Kölleda, Riem was the son of a lawyer. Just ten years old, without having had any lessons worth mentioning, he already performed as a piano player in Jena. He was able to attend the Thomasschule zu Leipzig and was a pupil of Johann Adam Hiller there, but became an orphan at an early age and studied law at the request of his grandfather. Hiller is said to have encouraged him to devote himself to music again after his law exams. He became solo pianist in the Gewandhausorchester in Leipzig. His opus 1, which was published in 1804, is said to have caused a sensation through its originality. His pupils included among others Henriette Grabau-Bünau, the daughter of the Bremen organist Lebrecht Grabau, with whom Riem also worked.

In 1814, Riem succeeded Justus Theophilus (Theodorus) Rauschelbach as organist at the Bremen Cathedral. At the beginning of his term of office he had the work of the organ rebuilt and enriched with romantic voices to achieve a stronger fundamental tone. In 1815, he founded the Bremer Singakademie with other music lovers, and was generally also its conductor (cathedral cantor) until his death. In 1820, he founded the 'Bremer Concert-Orchester', which became the 'Staatsorchester Bremen'. In 1825, he took over the direction of the performances when the "Verein für Privat-Conzerte" was founded, which made it one of the first civic orchestras in Germany. In 1895, the "Verein für Privat-Conzerte" became the "Philharmonische Gesellschaft". Through his functions he became a central figure in the musical life of Bremen.

In 1856, he received an honorary doctorate from the Leipzig University.

Riem died in Bremen at the age of 77.

For his tomb, the sculptor  designed a free-standing large sandstone figure as a "muse of mourning" in the shape of Saint Cecilia.

Work 
Since 1804, many of his sonnets, cantatas and quartets have been published. His late work, the oratorio Der Erlöser was not premiered until after his death. A complete edition of his organ compositions was published by Körner in Erfurt.

 Unser Vater, early romantic a cappella composition
 Ehre sei Gott
 Der Erlöser, Oratorio

Further reading 
 Herbert Schwarzwälder: Das Große Bremen-Lexikon. 2nd, updated, revised and extended edition. Edition Temmen, Bremen 2003, .

References

External links 
 

19th-century hymnwriters
German classical composers
German classical organists
1779 births
1857 deaths
Musicians from Thuringia